Il Mattino (meaning The Morning in English) is an Italian daily newspaper published in Naples, Italy.

History and profile
Il Mattino was first published on 16 March 1892 by the journalists Edoardo Scarfoglio and Matilde Serao. The paper is owned and published by Caltagirone Editore.

Il Mattino sold 87,777 copies in 2004. Based on the 2008 survey data from Accertamenti Diffusione Stampa, it was the most read daily newspaper in Campania, and according to Audipress, it was one of the most read papers in southern Italy with 975.000 readers in 2011. In 2008 the paper had a circulation of 79,573 copies.

References

External links
Il Mattino website

1892 establishments in Italy
Daily newspapers published in Italy
Italian-language newspapers
Newspapers established in 1892
Newspapers published in Naples